Antoine Sakr (also spelled Sacre) was a Lebanese footballer who played as an full-back.

He played for DPHB, Racing Beirut, and Sagesse at club level, and the Lebanon national team internationally. Sakr took part in Lebanon's first international match against Mandatory Palestine in 1940, and played for Beirut XI in 1946.

References

External links
 

Year of birth missing
Year of death missing
Association football fullbacks
Lebanese footballers
Lebanese Premier League players
AS DPHB players
Racing Club Beirut players
Sagesse SC footballers
Lebanon international footballers